Uruguayan American School (UAS) is an American private international school in Carrasco, Montevideo. It serves nursery through grade 12. As of 2015 it has 340 students, including Uruguayans and people of other nationalities.

See also

 Americans in Uruguay

References

External links
 Uruguayan American School

Uruguay
Schools in Montevideo
Private schools in Uruguay
American immigration to Uruguay
Association of American Schools in South America